Notre-Dame de Paris is a Gothic cathedral in Paris, France.

Notre-Dame de Paris may also refer to:

Notre-Dame de Paris (novel), an 1831 novel by Victor Hugo, known in English as The Hunchback of Notre Dame
Notre-Dame de Paris (1911 film), a 1911 French film, released in the US as The Hunchback of Notre Dame, based on the novel
Notre-Dame de Paris (1956 film), a 1956 French film, released in 1957 in the US as The Hunchback of Notre Dame, based on the novel
Notre-Dame de Paris (ballet), a 1965 ballet by French choreographer Roland Petit, based on the novel
 Notre-Dame de Paris (operatic melodrama), a Latvian operatic melodrama which debuted on 1997, in Riga
Notre-Dame de Paris (musical), a 1998 sung-through French-Canadian musical by Riccardo Cocciante and Luc Plamondon, based on the novel, which debuted in Paris
Virgin of Paris, a statue of the Virgin Mary in the Notre-Dame de Paris cathedral

See also
Notre Dame (disambiguation)